Chrysops fulvistigma is a species of deer fly in the family Tabanidae.

Subspecies
 Chrysops fulvistigma dorsopuncta Fairchild
 Chrysops fulvistigma fulvistigma Hine, 1904

Distribution
United States.

References

Tabanidae
Insects described in 1904
Diptera of North America